The Tour de France is a road cycling stage race held since 1903 over a current period of three weeks, although it was not staged from 1915 to 1918 and from 1940 to 1946, because of the First World War and Second World War respectively.

The winner of the Tour de France is determined by the general classification. In addition, there are some secondary classifications. The mountains classification, first calculated in 1933 and first associated with the polkadot jersey in 1975; 
To celebrate the 50th anniversary of the race in 1953, the points classification was reintroduced, having previously been the main classification from 1905 to 1912 inclusive. It rewarded the consistent finishers in individual stages by awarding points depending on the placing at the end of the stage and, from 1966 onwards, at any designated intermediate points along the route. From 1966 to 1989 inclusive, a separate classification was included solely for points awarded at these intermediate 'hot spots' or 'sprints' and from 1984 onward associated with the award of a red jersey.  In 1975, the Tour organisers launched the young rider classification, replacing the 'combination' classification run since 1968 for 'overall best rider' based on points awarded from the general, mountain and points classification- although the combination classification was subsequently reintroduced from 1980 to 1989 inclusive. Eddy Merckx in 1969 is the only rider to win the King of the Mountains, the points and the overall title in the same year.

By year

By country

References

 
Tour de France
Secondary classification winners
Secondary classification winners